The Most Distinguished Order of Saint Michael and Saint George is a British order of chivalry founded on 28 April 1818 by George IV, Prince of Wales, while he was acting as prince regent for his father, King George III.

It is named in honour of two military saints, Michael and George.

The Order of St Michael and St George was originally awarded to those holding commands or high position in the Mediterranean territories acquired in the Napoleonic Wars, and was subsequently extended to holders of similar office or position in other territories of the British Empire. It is at present awarded to men and women who hold high office or who render extraordinary or important non-military service to the United Kingdom in a foreign country, and can also be conferred for important or loyal service in relation to foreign and Commonwealth affairs.

Description
The Order includes three classes.

It is used to honour individuals who have rendered important services in relation to Commonwealth or foreign nations. People are appointed to the Order rather than awarded it. British Ambassadors to foreign nations are regularly appointed as KCMGs, DCMGs, or CMGs. For example, the former British Ambassador to the United States, Sir David Manning, was appointed a CMG when he worked for the British Foreign and Commonwealth Office (FCO), and then after his appointment as British Ambassador to the US, he was promoted to a Knight Commander (KCMG). It is the traditional award for members of the FCO.

The Order's motto is Auspicium melioris ævi (Latin for "Token of a better age"). Its patron saints, as the name suggests, are St. Michael the Archangel, and St. George, patron saint of England and of soldiers. One of its primary symbols is that of St Michael trampling over and subduing Satan in battle.

The Order is the sixth-most senior in the British honours system, after The Most Noble Order of the Garter, The Most Ancient and Most Noble Order of the Thistle, The Most Illustrious Order of St Patrick, The Most Honourable Order of the Bath, and The Most Exalted Order of the Star of India. The third of the aforementioned Orders—which relates to Ireland, no longer fully a part of the United Kingdom—still exists but is in disuse; no appointments have been made to it since 1936. The last of the Orders on the list, related to India, has also been in disuse since that country's independence in 1947.

History

The Prince Regent founded the Order to commemorate the British amical protectorate over the Ionian Islands, which had come under British control in 1814 and had been granted their own constitution as the United States of the Ionian Islands in 1817. It was intended to reward "natives of the Ionian Islands and of the island of Malta and its dependencies, and for such other subjects of His Majesty as may hold high and confidential situations in the Mediterranean".

In 1864, however, the protectorate ended and the Ionian Islands became part of Greece. A revision of the basis of the Order in 1868, saw membership granted to those who "hold high and confidential offices within Her Majesty's colonial possessions, and in reward for services rendered to the Crown in relation to the foreign affairs of the Empire". Accordingly, nowadays, almost all Governors-General and Governors feature as recipients of awards in the order, typically as Knights or Dames Grand Cross.

In 1965 the order was opened to women, with Evelyn Bark becoming the first female CMG in 1967.

Composition
The British Sovereign is the Sovereign of the Order and appoints all other members of the Order (by convention, on the advice of the Government). The next-most senior member is the Grand Master. The office was formerly filled by the Lord High Commissioner of the Ionian Islands; now, however, Grand Masters are chosen by the Sovereign. Grand Masters include:

 1818–1825: Sir Thomas Maitland
 1825–1850: Prince Adolphus, Duke of Cambridge
 1850–1904: Prince George, Duke of Cambridge
 1904–1910: George, Prince of Wales
 1910–1917: None
 1917–1936: Edward, Prince of Wales
 1936–1957: Alexander Cambridge, 1st Earl of Athlone
 1957–1959: Edward Wood, 1st Earl of Halifax
 1959–1967: Harold Alexander, 1st Earl Alexander of Tunis
 1967–present: Prince Edward, Duke of Kent

The Order originally included 15 Knights Grand Cross, 20 Knights Commanders, and 25 Companions but has since been expanded and the current limits on membership are 125, 375, and 1,750 respectively. Members of the Royal Family who are appointed to the Order do not count towards the limit, nor do foreign members appointed as "honorary members".

Officers
The Order has six officers. The Order's King of Arms is not a member of the College of Arms, like many other heraldic officers. The Usher of the Order is known as the Gentleman or Lady Usher of the Blue Rod. Blue Rod does not, unlike the usher of the Order of the Garter, perform any duties related to the House of Lords.

Prelate – David Urquhart  (Bishop of Birmingham)
Chancellor – Baroness Ashton of Upholland 
Secretary – Sir Philip Barton 
Registrar – Sir David Manning 
King of Arms – Sir Mark Lyall Grant 
Lady Usher of the Blue Rod – Dame DeAnne Julius

Habit and insignia

Members of the Order wear elaborate regalia on important occasions (such as coronations), which vary by rank:
 The mantle, worn only by Knights and Dames Grand Cross, is made of Saxon blue satin lined with crimson silk. On the left side is a representation of the star (see below). The mantle is bound with two large tassels.
 The collar, worn only by Knights and Dames Grand Cross, is made of gold. It consists of depictions of crowned English lions, Maltese Crosses, and the cyphers "SM" and "SG", all alternately. In the centre are two winged lions of St. Mark, each holding a bible and seven arrows—the emblem of the seven united Ionian Islands.

At less important occasions, simpler insignia are used:
 The star is an insignia used only by Knights and Dames Grand Cross and Knights and Dames Commanders. It is worn pinned to the left breast. The Knight and Dame Grand Cross' star includes seven-armed, silver-rayed 'Maltese Asterisk' (for want of a better description—see image of badge), with a gold ray in between each pair of arms. The Knight and Dame Commander's star is a slightly smaller eight-pointed silver figure formed by two Maltese Crosses; it does not include any gold rays. In each case, the star bears a red cross of St George. In the centre of the star is a dark blue ring bearing the motto of the Order. Within the ring is a representation of St Michael trampling on Satan.
 The badge is the only insignia used by all members of the Order; it is suspended on a blue-crimson-blue ribbon. Knights and Dames Grand Cross wear it on a riband or sash, passing from the right shoulder to the left hip. Knights Commanders and male Companions wear the badge from a ribbon around the neck; Dames Commanders and female Companions wear it from a bow on the left shoulder. The badge is a seven-armed, white-enamelled 'Maltese Asterisk' (see Maltese Cross); the obverse shows St Michael trampling on Satan, while the reverse shows St George on horseback killing a dragon, both within a dark blue ring bearing the motto of the Order. Prior to 2011, the devil was portrayed with black skin while St Michael was shown as being white; this was changed that year to show both with same skin color, although St Michael's wings were changed from being multi-color to being pure white. The alleged racism of this imagery has resulted in the government of Jamaica suspending the use of the badge entirely. In June 2020, calls were made for a complete redesign of the insignia, including from Sir Michael Palin of Monty Python fame, a Knight Commander of the Order

On certain "collar days" designated by the Sovereign, members attending formal events may wear the Order's collar over their military uniform or morning wear. When collars are worn (either on collar days or on formal occasions such as coronations), the badge is suspended from the collar. All collars which have been awarded since 1948 must be returned to the Central Chancery of the Orders of Knighthood. The other insignia may be retained.

Chapel

The original home of the Order was the Palace of St. Michael and St. George in Corfu, the residence of the Lord High Commissioner of the Ionian Islands and the seat of the Ionian Senate. Since 1906, the Order's chapel has been in St Paul's Cathedral in London. (The cathedral also serves as home to the chapels of The Most Excellent Order of the British Empire and the Imperial Society of Knights Bachelor.) Religious services for the whole Order are held quadrennially; new Knights and Dames Grand Cross are installed at these services.

The Sovereign and the Knights and Dames Grand Cross are allotted stalls in the choir of the chapel, above which their heraldic devices are displayed. Perched on the pinnacle of a knight's stall is his helm, decorated with a mantling and topped by his crest. Under English heraldic law, women other than monarchs do not bear helms or crests; instead, the coronet appropriate to the dame's rank, if there is one, is used. Above the crest or coronet, the stall's occupant's heraldic banner is hung, emblazoned with his or her coat of arms. At a considerably smaller scale, to the back of the stall is affixed a piece of brass (a "stall plate") displaying its occupant's name, arms and date of admission into the Order. Upon the death of a Knight, the banner, helm, mantling and crest are taken down. The stall plates, however, are not removed; rather, they remain permanently affixed somewhere about the stall, so that the stalls of the chapel are festooned with a colourful record of the Order's Knights and Dames Grand Cross since 1906.

The reredos within the chapel was commissioned from Henry Poole in 1927.

Precedence and privileges
Members of the Order of St Michael are assigned positions in the order of precedence in England and Wales. Wives of male members also feature on the order of precedence, as do sons, daughters and daughters-in-law of Knights Grand Cross and Knights Commanders; relatives of female members, however, are not assigned any special precedence. (Individuals can derive precedence from their fathers or husbands, but not from their mothers or wives. This follows the general rule of honours, that a husband never derives any style or title from his wife.)

Knights Grand Cross and Knights Commanders prefix "Sir", and Dames Grand Cross and Dames Commanders prefix "Dame", to their forenames. Wives of Knights may prefix "Lady" to their surnames, but husbands of Dames derive no title from their wives. Such forms are not used by peers and princes, except when the names of the former are written out in their fullest forms. Furthermore, honorary (foreign) members and clergymen do not receive the accolade and thus are not entitled to use the prefix "Sir" or "Dame". Knights and Dames Grand Cross use the post-nominal "GCMG"; Knights Commanders and Dames Commanders use "KCMG" and "DCMG" respectively; Companions use "CMG".

Knights and Dames Grand Cross are also entitled to receive heraldic supporters. They may, furthermore, encircle their arms with a depiction of the circlet (a circle bearing the motto) and the collar; the former is shown either outside or on top of the latter. Knights and Dames Commanders and Companions may display the circlet, but not the collar, surrounding their arms. The badge is depicted suspended from the collar or circlet.

Popular references
In the satirical British television programme Yes Minister, Jim Hacker MP is told a joke by his Private Secretary, Bernard Woolley, about what the various post-nominals stand for. From Season 2, Episode 2 "Doing the Honours":

Ian Fleming's spy, James Bond, a commander in the Royal Navy Volunteer Reserve (RNVR) was fictionally decorated with the CMG in 1953. This is mentioned in the novels From Russia, with Love and On Her Majesty's Secret Service, and on-screen in his obituary in Skyfall. He was offered the KCMG (which would have elevated him from Companion to Knight Commander in the Order) in The Man with the Golden Gun, but he rejected the offer as he did not wish to become a public figure. Dame Judi Dench's character "M" is "offered" early retirement and a GCMG in Skyfall.

Daniel Craig, who has portrayed Bond on film, was appointed (CMG) in the 2022 New Year Honours for services to film and theatre. The general release on 30 September 2021 of his last appearance as James Bond, in No Time to Die, had been delayed by almost two years due to a change of director and the COVID-19 pandemic. Coinciding with the film's premiere, and matching his fictional character's rank, Craig became an Honorary Commander in Britain's Royal Navy. Following this appointment, he committed to being an ambassador for the Royal Navy, particularly in its international role, and to the welfare of its service families.

Long-time Doctor Who companion Brigadier Lethbridge-Stewart wore the ribbon of the order as the highest of his decorations.

Current and past Knights and Dames Grand Cross

 Sovereign: King Charles III
 Grand Master: His Royal Highness The Duke of Kent  (1967)

Knights and Dames Grand Cross

Honorary
See List of current honorary Knights and Dames of the Order of St Michael and St George.

Gallery

See also
 List of people who have declined a British honour
 Order of the Bath
 Order of the British Empire
 Order of the Garter
 Order of the Thistle
 Royal Victorian Order
 Russian Order of St George

References

External links

 The Order of St Michael and St George at royal.uk
 The Order of St Michael and St George: 1818 to 2018 part one: its first century by Russell Malloch. [London, The Stationery Office, 2018] at thegazette.co.uk
 The Order of St Michael and St George: 1818 to 2018 part two: its second century by Russell Malloch. [London, The Stationery Office, 2018] at thegazette.co.uk
 "Knighthood and Chivalry", (1911). Encyclopædia Britannica, 11th ed. London: Cambridge University Press.
 Orans, L. P. "The Most Distinguished Order of Saint Michael and Saint George"
 Velde, F. R. (2003). "Order of Precedence in England and Wales"
 State Library of New South Wales: Nelson Meers Foundation —gallery to full set of insignia, including images of both sides of the badge and a close-up of the star.

 
1818 establishments in the United Kingdom
Saint Michael and Saint George, Order Of
Orders of chivalry of the United Kingdom
Awards established in 1818